Gracillaria toubkalella is a moth of the family Gracillariidae. It is known from Morocco.

The larvae feed on Fraxinus species. They mine the leaves of their host plant.

References

Gracillariinae
Endemic fauna of Morocco
Moths described in 1985
Moths of Africa